Hyaloseta is a genus of fungi within the Niessliaceae family. This is a monotypic genus, containing the single species Hyaloseta nolinae.

References

External links
Hyaloseta at Index Fungorum

Niessliaceae
Monotypic Sordariomycetes genera